Loraine Elizabeth Moore (1911–1988) was an American printmaker.

Her work is included in the collections of the Seattle Art Museum,  the National Gallery of Art, Washington and the Dallas Museum of Art.

References

1911 births
1988 deaths
20th-century American women artists